Scripta Geologica is a peer-reviewed scientific journal that publishes on vertebrate and invertebrate palaeontology, palaeobotany/palynology, stratigraphy, petrology, and mineralogy, including gemmology with a focus on systematics. It is published by the Dutch National Museum of Natural History, Naturalis.

Scripta Geologica was established in 1881 as Sammlungen des geologischen Reichsmuseums in Leiden (1881-1923), changing its title to Leidse Geologische Mededelingen in 1925 (originally spelled as Leidsche Geologische Mededeelingen). From 1971, the latter title was published in parallel with Scripta Geologica until they were merged in 1985.

Abstracting and indexing 
Scripta Geologica is abstracted and indexed in PASCAL, GeoBase, GeoAbstracts and GeoRef.

External links 
 

Paleontology journals
Publications established in 1883
English-language journals
Open access journals